The Bad Shepherds were an English folk band, formed by the comedian Adrian Edmondson in 2008. They played folk punk songs with traditional folk instruments. The band primarily consisted of Edmondson (vocals, mandolins, mandola) and Troy Donockley (uilleann pipes, cittern, whistles, vocals).

History
After "accidentally" buying a mandolin, Edmondson taught himself to play a few chords and he began to play a few punk songs on it. After playing for two days with Donockley, a virtuoso uilleann pipes player and multi-instrumentalist, they had arranged eight songs. After some initial experimentation, they enlisted Dinan, winner of the All-Ireland Fiddle Championship, and the band was formed. Essentially a folk band, the band's repertoire is taken from punk and new wave hits from 1978 to 1985. They re-interpret songs, inserting traditional reels and jigs.

After touring the United Kingdom during 2008, the Bad Shepherds released their debut album, Yan, Tyan, Tethera, Methera! (which translates from an ancient Cumbrian dialect as One, Two, Three, Four!) in May 2009. The band released their second album, By Hook or By Crook, with former Steeleye Span member Tim Harries playing double bass, in 2010. The Bad Shepherds also headlined the first Looe Music Festival in 2011.

At the start of 2013, after a year long hiatus the band announced they were getting back together to release a new album and undertake a 24-date UK tour, along with a six-date tour of Australia. Both of which were entitled Mud, Blood and Beer. The album was released on 19 August 2013, and included both cover versions of punk and new wave tracks, plus their own material.

Adrian Edmondson announced the band's end on his Facebook page on 31 October 2016.

Awards
The Bad Shepherds were nominated for the Best Live Act award at the 2010 BBC Radio 2 Folk Awards.

In 2012, the band won the Spiral Earth Award for best live act. The organisation celebrates a wide range of music, however their roots are mainly focused in the folk music genre.

Band members

Final line-up
Adrian Edmondson – vocals, mandolin, mandola
Troy Donockley – uilleann pipes, cittern, whistles, vocals

Former
Terl Bryant – percussion
Andy Dinan – fiddle
Carol Dawson – fiddle
Eimear Bradley – fiddle
Keith Angel – percussion
Mark Woolley – percussion
Maartin Allcock – bass
Brad Lang – bass
Tim Harries – bass

Discography

References

External links

English folk musical groups
Folk punk groups
Musical groups established in 2008
Musical groups disestablished in 2016